Pudhiya Payanam is a 2009 Indian Tamil language romantic drama film directed by M. D. Muthu. The film stars M. D. Muthu, Mithuna and Jennifer, with Manorama, Delhi Ganesh, Nalini, Charle, Aarthi, Chetan and Devadarshini playing supporting roles. The film, produced by Heera John, had musical score by Prasad Ganesh and was released on 10 July 2009.

Plot

The film begins with the famous playback singer Mithuna (Mithuna) returns home in Chennai.

In the past, in Yelagiri, Muthu (M. D. Muthu) was a blind man selling plastic wire baskets in the street to support his poor family: his stepmother (Nalini) and his school-going two stepsisters. Mithuna and her elder sister Devi (Devadarshini) who went for the holidays in Yelagiri came across Muthu and his family. Mithuna had sympathy for them so she decided to help them: she took them to Chennai, she lodged them in her house and she enrolled his stepsisters in an elementary school. Thereafter, Mithuna deeply fell in love with the innocent Muthu. She proposed her love for Muthu but he was sceptical about her love. Mithuna decided to donate her eyes to Muthu but doctor Ramana (Delhi Ganesh) refused to operate her and Muthu eventually found a donor.

Back to the present, Muthu has gained vision after the eye operation and he finally understands the pure love of Mithuna. Meanwhile, Mithuna's friend Jennifer (Jennifer) comes from Malaysia to Chennai and she falls in love with Muthu. Mithuna slowly becomes jealous and upset about the intimate relationship of Muthu and Jennifer. When Jennifer decides to return to Malaysia, she wants to bring Muthu with her and he accepts. Mithuna's family and friends begin to scold Muthu for being an ingrateful person and Jennifer reveals the reason behind his sudden behaviour change.

Just after the eye surgery, Muthu came to know that he was infected with the Hepatitis B virus. Knowing that his days are numbered, he didn't want to torment Mithuna and wanted her to forget him so he begged Jennifer to act as his girlfriend but Jennifer truly fell in love with him. A mournful Jennifer goes back to Malaysia and a sorrowful Mithuna continues her work. One night, Muthu wants to see Mithuna for the last time in her recording studio and Muthu bumps into a rowdy who wants to kill Mithuna outside the studio. Muthu manages to kill him and he is heavily wounded. A bloodied Muthu falls on the street and he tries to warn Mithuna of his presence but Mithuna drives away without seeing him and Muthu dies.

Cast

M. D. Muthu as Muthu
Mithuna as Mithuna
Jennifer as Jennifer
Manorama as Maami
Delhi Ganesh as Doctor Ramana
Nalini as Muthu's stepmother
Charle as Arumugam
Aarthi as Aarthi
Chetan as Devi's husband
Devadarshini as Devi
Besant Ravi
Jayan
Halwa Vasu as Driver
Vennira Aadai Moorthy
Nagalakshmi
Jayalalitha
Thyagarajan
Thangaraj
Velviliyan
Sivanarayanamoorthy

Production
M. D. Muthu made his directorial debut with Pudhiya Payanam under the banner of Vairam Movies. The film director M. D. Muthu himself played the lead role while Mithuna and Jennifer were selected to play the heroines.

Soundtrack

The film score and the soundtrack were composed by Prasad Ganesh. The soundtrack features 10 tracks written by Rajaji, M. G. Kanniyappan, Bharathi Kalyan, S. R. Pavalan, P. Veera Adithyan and Prasad Ganesh.

References

2009 films
2000s Tamil-language films
Indian romantic drama films
2009 romantic drama films